"5000 Ones" is a song by American hip hop artist DJ Drama. The song serves as his debut single and the lead single from his debut studio album Gangsta Grillz: The Album. The hip hop song, produced by Jazze Pha, features vocals from several rappers, namely Nelly, T.I., Yung Joc, Willie the Kid, Young Jeezy and Twista, as well as Diddy on background vocals and ad-libs. The single peaked at #52 on the U.S. Billboard Hot R&B/Hip-Hop Songs and peaked at #9 on the Hot Rap Tracks.

Music video
The music video for "5000 Ones" premiered on Rap City on October 20, 2007. The video features cameo appearances from Jazze Pha, Swizz Beatz, Mr. Collipark, Gorilla Zoe, Jim Jones, Webbie, DJ Khaled, Project Pat, Fabolous, Raekwon, Young Dro, Freeway, Diamond, Princess, Rasheeda, Jermaine Dupri, E-40, Project Pat, The-Dream, Rick Ross, Juelz Santana, David Banner and Lil Duval among others.

Charts

References

External links
 

2007 debut singles
2007 songs
DJ Drama songs
Nelly songs
T.I. songs
Yung Joc songs
Sean Combs songs
Jeezy songs
Twista songs
Grand Hustle Records singles
Atlantic Records singles
Song recordings produced by Jazze Pha
Songs written by Twista
Songs written by T.I.
Songs written by Jeezy
Songs written by Nelly
Songs written by Sean Combs
Songs written by Jazze Pha
Music videos directed by Dale Resteghini